Kavtaradze is a Georgian surname. Notable people with this surname include:

Gia Kavtaradze (born 1970), Georgian politician
Nodar Kavtaradze (born 1993), Russian footballer
Sergey Kavtaradze (1885–1971), Soviet Georgian politician

Georgian-language surnames